Khaleeji, may refer to:
 People of the Arabian Peninsula, especially those associated with the Gulf Cooperation Council states
 Culture of Eastern Arabia, associated with Arab states of the Persian Gulf
 Gulf Arabic, a dialect of the Arabic language spoken in Eastern Arabia's coast of the Persian Gulf
 Khaliji (music), a type of music from Eastern Arabia (Arab states of the Persian Gulf)
 Khaleeji (currency), an idea for a common currency for the Gulf Cooperation Council (GCC) member states
 Kaligi people, an ethnic group in South Sudan
 Kaligi language
 Khaliji, Iran, a village in Kerman Province, Iran

Language and nationality disambiguation pages